Paralamas e Titãs Juntos e Ao Vivo is a live album by Brazilian rock bands Paralamas do Sucesso and Titãs in 2008. It is the second live album recorded by both bands together, and it has been released as a DVD as well. The album is part of the bands' 25 years of career celebration, and several other shows took place in the beginning of 2008, with both bands sharing stage. Some well-known Brazilian artists made guest appearances during the show, like Andreas Kisser (from Sepultura), Samuel Rosa (from Skank), and Arnaldo Antunes (former Titãs member). For the live performances, both bands were nominated for "Best Live Act" at the 2008 MTV Video Music Brazil awards

Track listing

References 

Titãs live albums
Os Paralamas do Sucesso live albums
2008 live albums
EMI Records live albums